Kaarlo Bergbom (2 October 1843, Viipuri – 17 January 1906) was a Finnish theatre director. He was the founder of the Finnish National Theatre, the first Finnish language theatre company. Though he wrote very little as a playwright, he was responsible for introducing a number of important Finnish dramatists, particularly Minna Canth, and Finnish translations of William Shakespeare and other foreign writers. Bergbom also founded the magazine Kirjallinen Kuukausilehti.

He was the brother of senator Ossian Wuorenheimo and Emilie Bergbom. He is buried in the Hietaniemi Cemetery in Helsinki.

Notes

External links
 

1843 births
1906 deaths
People from Vyborg
People from Viipuri Province (Grand Duchy of Finland)
Finnish dramatists and playwrights
19th-century Finnish people
19th-century Finnish dramatists and playwrights
Burials at Hietaniemi Cemetery